1481 Tübingia, provisional designation , is a dark asteroid from the outer region of the asteroid belt, approximately 34 kilometers in diameter. It was discovered on 7 February 1938, by German astronomer Karl Reinmuth at Heidelberg Observatory in southern Germany, and named for the German city of Tübingen.

Orbit and classification 

Tübingia orbits the Sun in the outer main-belt at a distance of 2.9–3.1 AU once every 5 years and 3 months (1,916 days). Its orbit has an eccentricity of 0.04 and an inclination of 4° with respect to the ecliptic. The asteroid's first used observation was made at Heidelberg in 1933, extending the body's observation arc by 5 years prior to its official discovery observation.

Physical characteristics 

The asteroid has been characterized as a C-type asteroid.

Rotation period 

In October 2008, a rotational lightcurve of Tübingia was obtained form photometric observations by James W. Brinsfield at Via Capote Observatory  in California. Analysis gave a longer-than average rotation period of 24 hours with a brightness variation of 0.20 magnitude. The result supersedes a much longer period obtained in the 1980s.

Diameter and albedo 

According to the surveys carried out by the Infrared Astronomical Satellite IRAS, the Japanese Akari satellite, and NASA's Wide-field Infrared Survey Explorer with its subsequent NEOWISE mission, Tübingia measures between 33.26 and 40.12 kilometers in diameter, and its surface has an albedo of 0.082 to 0.117. The Collaborative Asteroid Lightcurve Link adopts the results from IRAS, that is, an albedo of 0.117 and a diameter of 33.26 kilometers using an absolute magnitude of 10.35.

Naming 

This minor planet was named after Tübingen, city in southern Germany and birthplace of astronomer Johannes Kepler. The official  was published by the Minor Planet Center in April 1953.

References

External links 
 Asteroid Lightcurve Database (LCDB), query form (info )
 Dictionary of Minor Planet Names, Google books
 Asteroids and comets rotation curves, CdR – Observatoire de Genève, Raoul Behrend
 Discovery Circumstances: Numbered Minor Planets (1)-(5000) – Minor Planet Center
 
 

 

001481
Discoveries by Karl Wilhelm Reinmuth
Named minor planets
19380207